Shirley Schaub Wilson (September 26, 1925 – January 8, 2021) was an American football coach and player. He served as the head football coach at Elon University for 1967 to 1976 and at Duke University from 1979 to 1982, compiling a career college football record of 88–61–3.

Wilson was born in 1925 in Madison, North Carolina. He played football at Davidson College in Davidson, North Carolina. Prior to coaching at Elon, he coached football at Richard J. Reynolds High School in Winston-Salem, North Carolina.  Wilson compiled a 71–35–2 (.667) record at Elon.  His 71 wins are the most of any coach in the history of the Elon Phoenix football program. In three of his final four seasons at Elon, his teams won 10 or more games. At Duke, Wilson compiled a 16–27–1 record.  He was a member of the North Carolina Sports Hall of Fame and the Winston-Salem/Forsyth County High School Sports Hall of Fame.

On January 8, 2021, he died at his home.

Head coaching record

College

References

1925 births
2021 deaths
Davidson Wildcats football players
Duke Blue Devils football coaches
Elon Phoenix athletic directors
Elon Phoenix football coaches
High school football coaches in North Carolina
High school football coaches in Virginia
People from Madison, North Carolina
Coaches of American football from North Carolina
Players of American football from North Carolina